Benjamin John Howard (born 24 April 1987) is an English singer-songwriter, musician and composer. His self-released debut EP Games in the Dark (2008) was followed by two more EPs, These Waters (2009) and Old Pine (2010). Signed to Island Records, his debut studio album came in 2011 titled Every Kingdom. The album reached number four on the UK Albums Chart and was certified double platinum by the British Phonographic Industry (BPI). Howard later released two more EPs, Ben Howard Live (2011) and The Burgh Island E.P. (2012).

At the 2013 Brit Awards ceremony he received two awards: British Male Solo Artist, and British Breakthrough Act. He performed at 2013 Glastonbury festival on the Pyramid Stage on Saturday 29 June. He released his second studio album, I Forget Where We Were, in October 2014, peaking at number one on the UK Albums Chart.

As of 2017, he is a member of the band A Blaze of Feather with India Bourne, Mickey Smith, Nat Wason, Rich Thomas and Kyle Keegan.

Howard's third studio album, Noonday Dream, was released in June 2018. It debuted at number four on the UK Albums Chart, and received favorable reviews from music critics. His fourth album, Collections from the Whiteout,  was released on 26 March 2021.

Early life
Benjamin John Howard was born on 24 April 1987 in Richmond, south-west London, England, and moved near Totnes, Devon when he was about eight. He was raised by musical parents who exposed him to their favourite records from singer-songwriter artists from the 1960s and 1970s at an early age, such as John Martyn, Van Morrison, Joni Mitchell and Simon & Garfunkel, by whom he was strongly influenced.

Howard began writing songs when he was eleven. In an interview with American Songwriter, he stated that when he was a kid he started playing guitar because he liked to put words together and make stuff up. "I was quite an imaginative little kid I guess. So your standard little love songs turned into your standard adolescent love songs. I think you start getting your own take on things when you're a late teen. That's when everything changes." Besides playing the guitar, Howard also played other instruments as a kid. He easily picked up the drums and contrabass, but after some time he decided to focus on the guitar. After attending King Edward VI Community College and Torquay Boys' Grammar School he began studying Journalism at University College Falmouth. Six months prior to completion of his course, Howard decided to focus on making music full-time, making melodic rootsy folk music, with progressively darker lyrics. His reputation grew around Devon, and soon spread to other areas of the UK. After a month of sold-out dates across Europe and the UK Howard was eventually asked to sign for Island Records.

Due to his association with the town, Howard was chosen in 2014 to appear on the 10 Totnes pound note.

Music career

2008–2011: Early releases
Before signing to a record label, Howard had already released some material. In 2008 he self-released his debut EP Games in the Dark. His first major release was These Waters, an EP featuring six tracks, including "The Wolves". In 2010, Ben Howard released the Old Pine EP, followed by a number of singles, such as "The Fear" and "Keep Your Head Up". Howard now had enough material to release an album, Every Kingdom, which would feature a number of his previous singles. One of the songs from this album, 'Promise' was used in the first episode of The 100. In 2010, he also started supporting Angus & Julia Stone's concerts in Europe. He also joined them for one live performance of Yellow Brick Road in Paris.

2011–13: Every Kingdom
Howard signed to Island Records in 2011, due to the label's history of UK folk singers, including Nick Drake and John Martyn. After singles "Old Pine" and "The Wolves" were released in 2011, Howard recorded his debut album entitled Every Kingdom, which was released on 3 October 2011. He was nominated for the 2012 Mercury Prize.

Howard worked alongside India Bourne, Marcus Wright and Chris Bond to make Every Kingdom, with Bourne playing cello, keyboards, ukulele, bass and contributing vocals and percussion, Bond playing guitars, bass, double bass, drums, percussion, keyboards, accordion, contributing to vocals, and also producing the record, and additional modular-dynamic (MD) synthesisers provided by Wright. He also toured with Bourne and Bond on his 2012 Every Kingdom tour, with support from Willy Mason.

In 2012, Howard launched his music in America with Every Kingdom being released on 3 April 2012, and appearances at South by Southwest (SXSW) in Texas and a US tour confirmed. His song "Promise" was featured at the end of season 8, episode 12 of TV show House.

In May 2012, Howard performed "The Wolves" on Later... with Jools Holland. He played at Pinkpop in the Netherlands on 26 May and Radio 1's Big Weekend in Hackney on 24 June 2012. He also played at the 2012 Bonnaroo Music Festival in Manchester, Tennessee, the 2012 T in the Park music festival in Scotland, as well as Beach Break Live 2012 in South Wales, Bestival 2012 and Splendour in the Grass 2012. Howard also played a slot at the Austin City Limits Music Festival in October 2012.

In November 2012, Howard released The Burgh Island EP produced by Chris Bond, which featured four new tracks. Once again released to critical acclaim, the EP had a darker, more menacing tone than most of Howard's previous work, with Howard also playing electric guitar, rather than his traditional acoustic.  The second track from the EP, "Oats in the Water", was featured in Internment, the 5th episode in Season 4 of AMC's The Walking Dead, in the 1st episode in season 3 of Fox's The Following, and in the release trailer for The Witcher 3: Wild Hunt. In 2014, the song "Promise" from the album Every Kingdom featured in the USA Network drama, Suits Season 3 Episode 11, "Buried Secrets" along with The CW drama Reign Season 1 Episode 10, "Sacrifice".

Ben Howard played on the main Pyramid Stage at Glastonbury Festival 2013, on Saturday 29 June 2013, in which he played five tracks from Every Kingdom. He also played on the Other Stage during Glastonbury Festival 2015.

2014: I Forget Where We Were
In 2014, Howard headlined the inaugural Somersault Festival, based in North Devon, with other artists such as Jack Johnson.

On 5 August 2014, Howard's first single "End of the Affair" from his second album was played on Zane Lowe's Radio 1 and Danielle Perry's XFM show. 
On 18 August 2014 Howard announced the title of his second album, I Forget Where We Were on Zane Lowe's show on Radio 1 whilst releasing the title track from the record at the same time. On 26 October "I Forget Where We Were" became number 26 in the UK Official Albums Chart.
On 6 April 2015, Howard announced a short string of tour dates in the US with English indie folk band Daughter as support. These dates were announced following a string of successful shows in Canada and the US.

2018: Noonday Dream
On 4 April 2018 it was announced that Howard's third album, titled Noonday Dream, would be released on 1 June 2018. A new single was also released, titled "A Boat To An Island On The Wall". The single debuted on Annie Mac's Radio 1 show with accompanying 2018 UK tour dates announced. A tracklist for the upcoming album was released on his website, along with 2 bonus vinyl-only tracks "Bird On A Wing" and "Interlude".

Together with his band Howard performed two songs from the album, "Nica Libres At Dusk" and "Towing The Line", on Later... with Jools Holland on 15 May 2018.

On 13 September 2018 Ben Howard released 'Another Friday Night/Heavy Summer (featuring Sylvan Esso)/Sister' a track of three different singles. Shortly after the release of these singles, he went on to release another single 'Heave Ho' in January 2019.

2021: Collections from the Whiteout 
On 26 January 2021, Ben Howard announced that his fourth album, Collections from the Whiteout, would be released on 26 March 2021. Along side the announcement, Howard released the single "What A Day". The album was produced by The National and Big Red Machine member Aaron Dessner, recorded over an 18 month period, mostly at Dessner's New York studio Long Pond with additional production in Paris.

Personal life
Howard has been in a relationship with Agatha Lintott since 2014. Howard is a supporter of Liverpool F.C.

Guitar style
Howard plays guitar left-handed and makes extensive use of alternate tunings such as CGCGGC (Old Pine, Everything), DADGAD (In Dreams) and CGA#GFC (End of the Affair, Esmerelda). He also complements these tunings by using a partial capo for many songs (Further Away, Everything, End of the Affair) in order to use harmonic or bass notes otherwise unavailable.

He also has a distinctive percussive strumming style, called the "pick and go", and Howard's method of laying the guitar flat on top of his knees and playing it percussively was influenced by contemporary folk songwriter and guitarist John Smith.

Discography

 Every Kingdom (2011)
 The Burgh Island EP (2012)
 I Forget Where We Were (2014)
 Noonday Dream (2018)
Collections from the Whiteout (2021)

Awards and nominations

BRIT Awards
Howard has won both BRIT Awards for which he has been nominated.

Mercury Prize
Howard has been nominated once for the Mercury Prize.

Ivor Novello Awards
Howard has been nominated three times for the Ivor Novello Awards.

References

External links

Official website

1987 births
Living people
Musicians from Devon
Island Records artists
English folk singers
English male singer-songwriters
Musicians from London
People from Richmond, London
Alumni of Falmouth University
Brit Award winners
21st-century English singers
21st-century British male singers